The Illini-Badger Football Conference (IBFC) was an athletic conference with the NCAA's Division III.  Member teams were located in Illinois and Wisconsin. As the name indicates, member teams only competed in football.  They participated in other athletic conferences in other sports. The conference's last season was in 2007.

Member teams during final season
Aurora University
Benedictine University
Concordia University Chicago
Concordia University Wisconsin
Eureka College
Greenville College
Lakeland College
MacMurray College

Former members
 Iowa Wesleyan College (1989–1992)
 Milton College (1976–1982)
 Northeastern Illinois University (1976–1988)
 Principia College (1989–1992)
 Quincy University (1993–1996)

Conference champions
1975 - Milton 
1976 - Milton 
1977 - Northeastern Illinois
1978 - Milton
1979 - Lakeland 
1980 - Milton
1981 - Concordia (WI), Milton & Northeastern Illinois
1982 - Northeastern Illinois 
1983 - Concordia (IL)
1984 - Northeastern Illinois
1985 - Lakeland
1986 - Lakeland
1987 - Concordia (IL)
1988 - Concordia (WI)
1989 - Greenville
1990 - Concordia (WI)
1991 - Eureka
1992 - Greenville
1993 - Quincy
1994 - Quincy
1995 - Eureka
1996 - Lakeland
1997 - Lakeland
1998 - Aurora
1999 - Aurora
2000 - Aurora
2001 - MacMurray
2002 - MacMurray
2003 - Concordia (WI)
2004 - Aurora, Concordia (WI) & Lakeland
2005 - Lakeland
2006 - Concordia (WI)
2007 - Concordia (WI) & Lakeland

See also
 Lake Michigan Conference
 Northern Illinois-Iowa Conference
 St. Louis Intercollegiate Athletic Conference
 Northern Athletics Conference

References